Isabel Castro may refer to:

 Lita Baron, Spanish-born American actress and singer born as Isabel Castro
 Isabel Castro (artist), Mexican American artist
 Isabel de Castro, Portuguese film actress
 Isabel Barreto de Castro, Spanish sailor and traveler, the first known woman to hold the office of admiral in European history